Conostylis setigera, commonly known as bristly cottonhead, is a tufted perennial plant species in the family Haemodoraceae. It is endemic to the south-west of Western Australia. Plants grow to between 5 and 36 cm high and produce yellow flowers between August and November in the species' native range.

The species was first formally described by botanist Robert Brown in 1810 in Prodromus Florae Novae Hollandiae.

Two subspecies are recognised:
Conostylis setigera subsp. dasys Hopper
Conostylis setigera R.Br. subsp. setigera

References

setigera
Commelinales of Australia
Angiosperms of Western Australia
Plants described in 1810
Taxa named by Robert Brown (botanist, born 1773)